The 1937 NFL season was the 18th regular season of the National Football League. The Cleveland Rams joined the league as an expansion team. Meanwhile, the Redskins relocated from Boston to Washington, D.C.

The season ended when the Redskins, led by rookie quarterback  Sammy Baugh, defeated the Chicago Bears in the NFL Championship Game.

Draft
The 1937 NFL Draft was held on December 12, 1936 at New York City's Hotel Lincoln. With the first pick, the Philadelphia Eagles selected runningback Sam Francis from the University of Nebraska–Lincoln.

Major rule changes
All players are required to wear numerals on their jerseys whose color must be in sharp contrast with the jersey color. The numbers on the front must be at least  while the ones on the back must be at least .
If a kickoff goes out of bounds, the ball is put in play either on the opponent's 35-yard line or 10 yards from the spot where it crossed the sideline.
The penalty for an illegal forward pass that is thrown beyond the line of scrimmage is a loss of down and five yards from the spot of the foul.

Division races
Midway through the NFL's 11-game season, the Bears were unbeaten (5–0) in the Western Division, while the Giants were leaders in the Eastern (4–1), and they played to a 3–3 tie. The Giants and Bears continued to stay in the lead in their divisions, and the Bears clinched a spot in the title game with its 13–0 win over Detroit. On December 5, 1937, the final game of the season had Washington (7–3 and .700) traveling to New York (6–2–2 and .750). A win or a tie would give the Giants the Eastern title; the Redskins triumphed, 49–14, and got the division crown and the trip to face Chicago in the 1937 championship game.

Final standings

NFL Championship Game

Washington 28, Chi. Bears 21, at Wrigley Field, Chicago, December 12, 1937

League leaders

Coaching changes
Brooklyn Dodgers: Paul J. Schissler was replaced by Potsy Clark.
Cleveland Rams: The team joined the NFL, hiring Hugo Bezdek as head coach.
Detroit Lions: George Clark was replaced by Dutch Clark.
Pittsburgh Pirates: Joe Bach was replaced by Johnny Blood.

Stadium changes
 The Cleveland Rams split their home games between Cleveland Municipal Stadium and League Park
 The relocated Washington Redskins relocated from Boston's Fenway Park to Griffith Stadium in Washington, D.C.

See also
1937 American Football League season

References
NFL Record and Fact Book
NFL History 1931–1940 (Last accessed December 4, 2005)
Total Football: The Official Encyclopedia of the National Football League

National Football League seasons